Arsénia Felicidade Félix Massingue is a Mozambican politician who has been the Minister of the Interior since November 2021. She is the first woman to serve as Interior Minister in Mozambican history.

Background
Massingue had served as the provincial police commander in the Inhambane, Manica and Nampula provinces. Before her appointment as a cabinet minister, Massingue had served as the Director of the National Immigration Service (SENAMI).

On 11 November 2021, Massingue was appointed as the Minister of the Interior by president Filipe Nyusi, replacing Amade Miquidade, who was dismissed by Nyusi without an explanation. She is the first woman to serve as Interior Minister in Mozambican history.

References

Living people
Year of birth missing (living people)
Place of birth missing (living people)
21st-century Mozambican politicians
Interior ministers of Mozambique
Women government ministers of Mozambique
Female interior ministers